Xochitlicue (meaning in Nahuatl 'the one that has her skirt of flowers') is the Aztec goddess of fertility, patroness of life and death, guide of rebirth, younger sister of Coatlicue, Huitzilopochtli's mother according Codex Florentine; and Chimalma, Quetzalcoatl's mother according Codex Chimalpopoca. One of the three daughters of Tlaltecuhtli and Tlalcihuatl, the couple of the earth gods created by the Tezcatlipocas.

Mother of the twin brothers Xochipilli, 'Prince of Flowers'; and Xochiquetzal, 'Precious Feather Flower', the goddess of beauty and love.

References 

Aztec goddesses
Mesoamerican deities
Fertility goddesses
Health goddesses
Death goddesses
Life-death-rebirth goddesses